This is a list of all cricketers who have played first-class or List A matches for House Building Finance Corporation cricket team. The team played 105 first-class matches between 1976 and 1993 and 72 List A matches between 1981 and 1993. Seasons given are first and last seasons; the player did not necessarily play in all the intervening seasons.

Players
 Aamer Khurshid, 1987/88-1996/97
 Abdul Hameed, 1976/77
 Abdul Jalil, 1979/80
 Abid Ali, 1976/77
 Aftab Ahmed, 1979/80-1980/81
 Agha Irshad, 1978/79-1980/81
 Ali Ahmed, 1983/84-1993/94
 Ali Zia, 1976/77
 Altaf Shah, 1976/77-1978/79
 Anwar Jamil, 1976/77
 Arshad Nawaz, 1976/77
 Asif Nazir, 1976/77-1980/81
 Ataullah Khan, 1993/94
 Athar Khan, 1979/80-1980/81
 Babar Basharat, 1976/77
 Ehteshamuddin, 1977/78
 Faisal Qureshi, 1989/90-1996/97
 Iftikhar Ahmed, 1979/80-1980/81
 Ijaz Ahmed, 1983/84-1986/87
 Ijaz Elahi, 1993/94
 Ijaz Saeed, 1980/81-1983/84
 Irshad Ahmed, 1977/78-1984/85
 Izhar Ahmed, 1976/77-1987/88
 Jahangir Khan sen, 1993/94
 Javed Sadiq, 1976/77-1984/85
 Kabir Khan, 1991/92-1993/94
 Kazim Mehdi, 1979/80-1995/96
 Maqsood Hussain, 1980/81
 Mohammad Islam, 1980/81
 Mohammad Jamil, 1976/77
 Mohammad Javed jun, 1983/84-1985/86
 Mohammad Riaz, 1988/89
 Mohinder Kumar, 1985/86-1994/95
 Mohsin Akhtar, 1978/79
 Mohtashim Rasheed, 1993/94
 Monis Qadri, 1989/90-1993/94
 Munir-ul-Haq, 1983/84-1997/98
 Muzammil Izhar, 1990/91
 Noor-ul-Qamar, 1979/80-1986/87
 Nusrat Mahboob, 1992/93-1995/96
 Pervez Akhtar, 1976/77-1995/96
 Pervez-ul-Hasan, 1990/91-1993/94
 Qamar Zaidi, 1976/77-1979/80
 Raees Ahmed, 1978/79-1986/87
 Rafat Alam, 1979/80-1994/95
 Rashid Ahmed, 1990/91
 Rashid Usman, 1977/78
 Rehmatullah, 1980/81
 Saadat Ali, 1983/84-1989/90
 Saeed Anjum, 1978/79-1980/81
 Sagheer Abbas, 1983/84-1988/89
 Saleem Taj, 1984/85-1994/95
 Saleemuddin, 1976/77-1980/81
 Sarfraz Azeem, 1989/90-1990/91
 Sarfraz Hasan, 1976/77-1983/84
 Shafiq Ahmed, 1976/77-1980/81
 Shahid Khan, 1993/94
 Shahid Saeed, 1986/87-1995/96
 Shahzad Ilyas, 1987/88-1993/94
 Shaukat Mirza, 1985/86-1986/87
 Sibtain Haider, 1986/87
 Sohail Khan, 1986/87-1995/96
 Sohail Taqi, 1992/93
 Tahir Rasheed, 1983/84-1986/87
 Tariq Alam, 1978/79-1997/98
 Tariq Bashir, 1976/77
 Tariq Khan, 1993/94
 Tariq Nazar, 1986/87
 Tariq Wahab, 1983/84-1984/85
 Taufiq Tirmizi, 1977/78-1980/81
 Wasim Ali, 1989/90-1993/94
 Wasim Arif, 1984/85-1988/89
 Wasim Yousufi, 1991/92-1993/94
 Zahoor Elahi, 1988/89
 Zulfiqar Butt, 1988/89-1992/93
 Zulqarnain, 1989/90-1990/91

References

House Building Finance Corporation cricketers